Scurta may refer to several villages in Romania:

 Scurta, a village in Orbeni Commune, Bacău County
 Scurta, a village in Pogăceaua Commune, Mureș County